Hopkins Graded School, also known as Old Hopkins School, is a historic school building located at Hopkins, Richland County, South Carolina. It was built about 1897, as a one-teacher school. It is a rambling, one-story, "L"-shaped, frame building with weatherboard siding and a gable roof. It features a small square belfry with a pyramidal roof. A new school was constructed across the street about 1914, and the old school was subsequently used as a teacherage.

It was added to the National Register of Historic Places in 1986.

References

School buildings on the National Register of Historic Places in South Carolina
School buildings completed in 1897
Buildings and structures in Richland County, South Carolina
National Register of Historic Places in Richland County, South Carolina